Djuan is a rural locality in the Toowoomba Region, Queensland, Australia. In the  Djuan had a population of 100 people.

History 
The locality takes its name from an Aboriginal name for the grey forest possum.

Djuan Provisional School opened on 14 November 1895. On 1 January 1909 it became Djuan State School. It closed in 1969.

On 19 November 1901 a Methodist church opened in Djuan.

In the  Djuan had a population of 100 people.

References 

Toowoomba Region
Localities in Queensland